Steadman 'Sted' Hay (born 1 June 1939) is a former Australian rules footballer who played for Hawthorn in the VFL. He played as a half back flanker.

Sted is one of three brothers that played at Hawthorn older brother Bill and middle brother Phil.

External links

1939 births
Hawthorn Football Club players
Hawthorn Football Club Premiership players
Australian rules footballers from Victoria (Australia)
Living people
One-time VFL/AFL Premiership players